Tabarka–Aïn Draham International Airport , formerly Tabarka–7 November International Airport, is an airport serving Tabarka in Tunisia.

History 
Tabarka Airport was built in 1992 to serve the northwest region of Tunisia. Its original name emanated from the November 7, 1987 coup d'etat that ousted Habib Bourguiba, the first President of Tunisia, which was orchestrated by then-Prime Minister Zine el Abidine Ben Ali, who replaced Bourguiba; however, the airport was renamed following the 2011 Revolution that ousted and exiled Ben Ali.

The airport facilitates tourism in the region. However, due to a decline in tourism after the Revolution, the airport experienced a drop in traffic. In 2010, 63,000 passengers transited through Tabarka Airport; in 2011, it received less than 18,000 passengers. On 15 November 2013, rumours of the closure of the airport led to protests by its employees.

Tabarka Airport is currently served by Tunisair Express flights to Tunis. During the Hajj season, Tunisair operates charter flights to Medina.

Airlines and destinations

References

External links
 Official website of the Tunisian Civil Aviation and Airports Authority
 
 

Airports in Tunisia
Airports established in 1992